Television in Paraguay is most important among the country's mass media. Television programming is dominated by telenovelas, series, and news programming.

Local channels

Most viewed channels

References